Unto Raisa (born 19 March 1934) is a Finnish chess player, two-times Finnish Chess Championship medalist (1962, 1964).

Biography
From the first half of 1960s, Unto Raisa was one of Finland's leading chess players. In Finnish Chess Championships he has won two  silver (1962, 1964) medals.

Unto Raisa played for Finland in the Chess Olympiads:
 In 1960, at fourth board in the 14th Chess Olympiad in Leipzig (+8, =8, -3),
 In 1962, at second board in the 15th Chess Olympiad in Varna (+5, =7, -7).

Unto Raisa played for Finland in the European Team Chess Championship preliminaries:
 In 1961, at seventh board in the 2nd European Team Chess Championship preliminaries (+3, =1, -0).

References

External links

Unto Raisa chess games at 365chess.com

1934 births
Living people
Finnish chess players
Chess Olympiad competitors
20th-century chess players